Dasyscopa axeli is a moth in the family Crambidae. It was described by Nuss in 1998. It is found on Sumatra.

References

Moths described in 1998
Scopariinae